Charles Henry Mills, 1st Baron Hillingdon (26 April 1830 – 3 April 1898), known from 1872 to 1886 as Sir Charles Mills, 2nd Baronet, was a British banker and Conservative politician.

Hillingdon was the only son of Sir Charles Mills, 1st Baronet, and his wife Emily, daughter of Richard Henry Cox. He was a partner in the banking firm of Glyn, Mills & Co. In 1865 he entered Parliament for Northallerton, a seat he held until 1866 when he was unseated due to bribery by his agents. Later, he represented Kent West from 1868 to 1885.

He succeeded his father in the baronetcy in 1872, inheriting Hillingdon Court. On 15 February 1886 he was raised to the peerage as Baron Hillingdon, of Hillingdon in the County of Middlesex.

Lord Hillingdon had married Lady Louisa Isabella, daughter of Henry Lascelles, 3rd Earl of Harewood, in 1853. He died in April 1898, aged 67, and was succeeded in his titles by his eldest son Charles. Lady Hillingdon died in November 1918, aged 88.

Arms

References

External links 
 

1830 births
1898 deaths
British bankers
Barons in the Peerage of the United Kingdom
Conservative Party (UK) MPs for English constituencies
UK MPs 1865–1868
UK MPs 1868–1874
UK MPs 1874–1880
UK MPs 1880–1885
UK MPs who were granted peerages
Peers of the United Kingdom created by Queen Victoria
19th-century British businesspeople